The infraorder Tridactylidea has a single extant superfamily which includes pygmy mole crickets; they are thought to represent living representatives of the most basal Caelifera: the Orthopteran suborder that includes grasshoppers.

Superfamilies and families
The infraorder consists of two superfamilies, one living and one extinct; the Orthoptera Species File lists the following:
 †Dzhajloutshelloidea Gorochov, 1994
 †Dzhajloutshellidae Gorochov, 1994
 †Regiatidae Gorochov, 1995
 Tridactyloidea Brullé, 1835
 Cylindrachetidae Giglio-Tos, 1914
 Ripipterygidae Ander, 1939
 Tridactylidae Brullé, 1835

References

External links 

Caelifera
Insect infraorders
Taxa named by Gaspard Auguste Brullé